Patrik Gross (born 6 May 1978) is a Czech football defender.

References

External links

 at spartak.sk 

1978 births
Living people
Czech footballers
Association football defenders
Czech First League players
SK Kladno players
FC Spartak Trnava players
Slovak Super Liga players
Expatriate footballers in Slovakia
Czech expatriate sportspeople in Slovakia
FC Dolní Benešov players
Sportspeople from Ostrava